Chris "Spoons" Daniels (born September 30, 1952) is an American bandleader, singer, songwriter, and multi-instrumentalist. A member of the Colorado Music Hall of Fame, he is best known for his work with Chris Daniels & the Kings, a band he has led since 1984.  He is considered an "icon of Colorado music" and is recognized for his role as a member of Magic Music, frequently described as Colorado's first jam band.

Early life and career
Daniels was born in St. Paul, Minnesota, and began playing guitar when he was 10.  At seventeen, he moved to the East Coast and performed with several groups, and for a short time played in a band led David Johansen, who later formed The New York Dolls.  In 1971,  Daniels moved to Colorado, and in 1972 he joined an acoustic jam band, Magic Music, which would come to be regarded as Colorado's first jam band.  In addition to songwriting and singing,  Daniels played lead guitar, mandolin, and banjo with Magic Music, whose members included Will Luckey, George Cahill, Bill Makepeace, Tim Goodman of Southern Pacific and Navarro/Leftover Salmon bassist Rob Galloway.  The group toured extensively in the United States and appeared at the 2nd and 3rd Telluride Bluegrass Festival.  The band broke up in 1976.

Daniels subsequently resumed his education, and attended Berklee College of Music and Macalester College.  He graduated cum laude from Macalester in 1979.

After receiving his degree, Daniels returned to Colorado and formed Spoons, who in 1981 released the album Definitely Live on Sunshine Records. In 1982, he toured the United States with Russell Smith of the Amazing Rhythm Aces, performing on guitar, mandolin, and banjo.  He also founded a late night concert series called "After Hours Jam" at the Sheridan Opera House in Telluride.  He served as the bandleader and master of ceremonies for the series, which included performances by Lyle Lovett, Vince Gill, Edgar Meyer, Victor Wooten, Henry Paul, Howard Levy, Jonell Mosser, Bill Payne, Al Kooper and others.  Daniels met David Bromberg at the After Hours Jam, and they later played together at concerts in Colorado, Chicago, and New York. In 1989, Daniels appeared on Bromberg's album Sideman Serenade.

In 1983 he performed with New Grass Revival (Sam Bush, John Cowan, Bela Fleck, and Pat Flynn) at the Telluride Bluegrass Festival.

In 1984, Daniels formed Chris Daniels & The R&B Kings (later shortened to The Kings).  Although originally planned as a "Boulder one-nighter," the band has released 14 albums and toured extensively in the United States and completed 21 European tours. Acclaimed for their live performances as well as their records, Chris Daniels & the Kings have performed at prestigious festivals including the Carolina Downhome Blues Festival, Parkpop in the Netherlands and Marktrock in Belgium.  They have performed for three US presidents and the former queen of the Netherlands, and have been featured on a variety of American and European television shows.  They became the Friday night headliner at the Telluride Bluegrass Festival in 1986 and continued in that role through 1991.
 
In addition to performing their own music—a blend of jump blues, funk, R&B and swing—the Kings served as the back up band for artists including Bromberg, Sam Bush, Was Not Was, Bonnie Raitt, John Cowan, Al Kooper, Francine Reed, The Coasters, Henry Paul, The Platters, The Drifters, Bo Diddley and Percy Sledge.

In 1995, Daniels received a Master of Arts in History/Economic History at the University of Colorado at Boulder.  From 1995-2000, he served as the executive director of the Swallow Hill Music Association, an influential roots, folk, and acoustic music school and concert organization.  
He began teaching in 2002 as an adjunct professor at Arapahoe Community College.  Following his tenure at Arapahoe, he joined the faculty of the University of Colorado, Denver.  He is an assistant professor in the College of Arts & Media and serves as the area head for the music business program.

Daniels was diagnosed with acute myeloid leukemia in February 2010.  He underwent chemotherapy and a bone marrow transplant via stem cells from his sister, Dr. Jane Moffet, and returned to recording, teaching and performing that fall.  In 2012 he released Better Days, a solo album dedicated to "those who go through hard times."  A return to roots music, it appeared on the national Americana charts.

As a songwriter, Daniels has collaborated with artists including Gary Nicholson, Al Kooper, and Bill Payne and his songs have appeared on albums by Hazel Miller and Tom Wasinger, among others. Daniels' music has been featured on the television show Men in Trees, and, as a commercial singer, he has worked on commercials for companies including McDonald's, Ford Motor Company, and Coors Beer.

Daniels was a co-nominee for a 2013 Grammy Award for Jumpin' Jazz Kids, a children's album he worked on with Al Jarreau, Hubert Laws and Dee Dee Bridgewater.  That same year, Daniels was inducted into the Colorado Music Hall of Fame,  along with Judy Collins, The Serendipity Singers and Bob Lind.

In 2015, Daniels released Funky to the Bone, which was critically acclaimed by international media outlets and blues and soul magazines including Downbeat and Roots Music Report. Daniels teaches full-time and performs more than 100 shows a year.

In early 2018, Daniels was named the executive director of the Colorado Music Hall of Fame.

Discography

References

External links
 Official website 

1952 births
Living people
American bandleaders
Provogue Records artists
Flying Fish Records artists